Georgios Ntoskas (born 11 November 1984) is a retired Greek water polo player who competed in the 2008 Summer Olympics (7th place) with the Greece men's national water polo team. Ntoskas was part of the national squad that won the Bronze Medal in the 2005 World Championship in Montreal and the Bronze Medal in the 2006 World League in Athens.

Ntoskas started his career at his native NC Chios and in 2003 he moved to Olympiacos where he played for thirteen seasons (2003–2011, 2012–2017), winning 23 major titles (12 Greek Championships and 11 Greek Cups) and being runner-up of the 2015–16 LEN Champions League in Budapest.

Honours

Club
Olympiacos
 LEN Champions League Runner-up: 2015–16
 Greek Championship (12): 2003–04, 2004–05, 2006–07, 2007–08, 2008–09, 2009–10, 2010–11, 2012–13, 2013–14, 2014–15, 2015–16, 2016–17
 Greek Cup (11):  2003–04, 2005–06, 2006–07, 2007–08, 2008–09, 2009–10, 2010–11, 2012–13, 2013–14, 2014–15, 2015–16

National team
  Bronze Medal in 2005 World Championship, Montreal
  Bronze Medal in 2006 World League, Athens

See also
 List of World Aquatics Championships medalists in water polo

References

External links
 

1984 births
Living people
Greek male water polo players
Olympiacos Water Polo Club players
Olympic water polo players of Greece
Water polo players at the 2008 Summer Olympics
World Aquatics Championships medalists in water polo
Sportspeople from Chios